Almalı or Almali may refer to:
Almalı, Dashkasan, Azerbaijan
Almalı, Khojali, Azerbaijan
Almalı, Qakh, Azerbaijan
Almali, Zanjan, Iran